Caesar Metro Taipei (Chinese：凱達大飯店) is a skyscraper hotel located on Bangka Boulevard, Wanhua District, Taipei, Taiwan, near Wanhua railway station, which opened on November 24, 2017.

Facilities
The hotel has 750 guest rooms, and 30 floors with two basements. Facilities include an outdoor swimming pool and fitness gym.

Restaurants & Bars
 Jia Yan: Chinese restaurant featuring traditional Taiwanese and Cantonese cuisine located on the third floor.
 Metro Buffet: Buffet restaurant serving a wide variety of both international and local flavors located on the fifth floor.
 Bar 98: Bar offering a selection of wine, cocktails and exquisite snacks, located on the fifth floor.

See also
 Caesar Park Hotel Banqiao
 Caesar Park Taipei

References

External links
Official website

Skyscraper hotels in Taipei
Hotels established in 2017
Hotel buildings completed in 2017